Makwa River is a river in the Canadian province of Saskatchewan in the transition zone between parkland and boreal forest. Makwa is Cree for Loon. The upper reaches of the Makwa River's watershed reach just across the border into Alberta and includes lakes such as Hewett, Ministikwan, Makwa, and Jumbo.

Description 
Makwa River begins at the north-east corner of Makwa Lake in Makwa Lake Provincial Park and flows east then north-east to meet the Beaver River. Downstream water flows are controlled by Makwa Lake Control dam at the outflow point of Makwa Lake. The main tributary for Makwa Lake is Ministikwan Creek, which has its source at Ministikwan Lake. As Makwa River heads east, it is met by the south-flowing Horsehead Creek.

Makwa Lake Control 
Makwa Lake Control was originally built as a timber dam in 1965. In 2010, the dilapidated timber dam was replaced by a concrete one. The original dam did not have a fish ladder but one was built for the 2010 concrete one. The dam regulates water levels on Makwa, Upper Makwa, Jumbo, and Little Jumbo Lakes. Access to the dam is from Highway 26.

See also 
List of rivers of Saskatchewan
Hudson Bay drainage basin
Tourism in Saskatchewan

References 

Rivers of Saskatchewan
Meadow Lake No. 588, Saskatchewan
Loon Lake No. 561, Saskatchewan
Tributaries of Hudson Bay